A Nancy Wilson Christmas is a 2001 studio album of Christmas music by the American singer Nancy Wilson. As well as being Wilson's first album of Christmas music, it was the first album that Wilson recorded for the Manchester Craftsmen's Guild record label, MCG Jazz.

Reception

Rick Anderson on Allmusic.com gave the album four stars out of five. Anderson expressed surprise that this was Wilson's first Christmas album and described it as "sweet-spirited and gently eclectic as you'd expect...Wilson manages to keep things both interesting and fun. The fact that her voice remains as powerful and nuanced as ever doesn't hurt, either." The album was also positively reviewed in Billboard by Melinda Newman who commented that "The party to attend this year is at Wilson's house...just a collection of traditional tunes delivered with beautiful understatement by Wilson..."

Track listing
 "Let It Snow! Let It Snow! Let It Snow!" (Sammy Cahn, Jule Styne) - 3:54
 "Sweet Little Jesus Boy" (Robert MacGimsey) - 4:08
 "White Christmas" (Irving Berlin) - 3:47
 "Silver Bells" (Ray Evans, Jay Livingston) - 4:04
 "What Are You Doing New Year's Eve?" (Frank Loesser) - 4:48
 "All Through the Night" (Traditional) - 3:56
 "O Christmas Tree" (Traditional) - 4:39
 "O Holy Night" (Adolphe Adam, John Sullivan Dwight) - 5:02
 "Carol of the Bells" (Traditional) - 6:28
 "God Rest Ye Merry Gentlemen" (Traditional) - 3:29
 "Christmas Time Is Here" (Vince Guaraldi, Lee Mendelson) - 3:29
 "Angels We Have Heard on High" (Traditional) - 3:49
 "The Christmas Song" (Mel Tormé, Robert Wells) - 5:31

Charts

References

2001 Christmas albums
Christmas albums by American artists
Nancy Wilson (jazz singer) albums
MCG Jazz albums